Conneaut Creek  is a  tributary of Lake Erie in northwestern Pennsylvania and northeastern Ohio in the United States.  Via Lake Erie, the Niagara River and Lake Ontario, it is part of the watershed of the St. Lawrence River, which flows to the Atlantic Ocean.

Conneaut Creek rises in western Crawford County, Pennsylvania, and initially flows north-northwestwardly past Conneautville into western Erie County.  Near Albion, it turns to the west-southwest and roughly parallels the shoreline of Lake Erie for some length, at a distance of about 5 mi (8 km) inland, into northeastern Ashtabula County, Ohio, where, at Kingsville, it turns to the northeast to flow into Lake Erie at the city of Conneaut.

Variant names and spellings
According to the Geographic Names Information System, Conneaut Creek has also been known historically as:
Caneaught Creek 
Conneaut River
Coneaught Creek
Conneaugh River
Conneought Creek
Conyeayout Creek
Counite Riviere

See also
List of rivers of Ohio
List of rivers of Pennsylvania

References

Rivers of Ashtabula County, Ohio
Rivers of Ohio
Rivers of Pennsylvania
Tributaries of Lake Erie
Rivers of Crawford County, Pennsylvania
Rivers of Erie County, Pennsylvania